Deyemi Okanlawon is a Nigerian film, television, theatre and voice actor. He is best known for his roles in Omo Ghetto: The Saga, Blood Sisters and King of Boys: The Return of the King. He has been listed as the highest grossing Nollywood actor of 2020 and 2021.

Early life

Okanlawon was born in Lagos, Southwest Nigeria to an Aircraft Engineer father Adeyemi Okanlawon, and Adeyinka Okanlawon a baker and entrepreneur. He had his primary school education at Taikenny Nursery and Primary School in Lagos, and his secondary education at International School, Lagos. He then went on to study Chemical Engineering at the University of Lagos, Lagos, Nigeria. A former baker and sales and marketing executive he also obtained a Certificate in Acting for Film, from the New York Film Academy.

Career

Okanlawon had his first experience with acting at the age of 5, when he featured in an ‘end-of-year’ play while in primary school. At the age of 9, Okanlawon featured in a nationally syndicated Television commercial with Kunle Bamtefa. While at the University of Lagos, Okanlawon became an active member of the drama groups Gf(x) (Harvesters Company), Xtreme Reaction and Snapshots (Covenant Christian Centre).

Okanlawon made his featured film debut in the 2010 movie ZR-7, before which he featured in a short film titled A Grain of Wheat. He went on to feature in and co-produce many more short films and by 2012 he had gained notoriety for his numerous appearances in made-for-internet short films and web series including Blink, 6:30pm and Knock Knock. In 2013 he switched careers to focus on acting full-time and has since featured in over 50 film credits, 8 stage credits and has appeared in OLX and GLO Television commercials as well as music videos for Waje and Aramide. He has also had roles in movies such as Greg Odutayo's “Beyond Blood” starring Joseph Benjamin and Kehinde Bankole; Pascal Amanfo's If Tomorrow Never Comes starring Yvonne Nelson, Ishaya Bako's Road To Yesterday starring Genevieve Nnaji and Majid Michel and Pascal Amanfo's No Man’s Land starring Adjetey Anang. He was in NdaniTV's series Gidi Up with OC Ukeje, Titilope Sonuga, Somkele Iyamah and Joke Silva. He has also featured in the TV Series Taste Of Love, Lekki Wives, An African City and Dowry.

In 2013, he won Best Actor in a Short Film at the In-Short film festival for his role as a psychotic husband in the thriller, Blink. He attended the Acting for Film course at the New York Film Academy in collaboration with Del-York.

In 2015, Deyemi founded Covenant Entertainment Services, a production and talent management firm and soon became a consultant to Silverbird Film Distribution. In 2019 he took up the position of marketing manager at Silverbird Distribution, rose to head Nollywood and Independent movie distribution and thereafter took over the management of the operations of the company as acting CEO.

In 2022, he received his first ever nomination at the Africa Magic Viewers' Choice Awards for Best Actor in a Comedy for his role in "Omo Ghetto: The Saga".

Personal life

Okanlawon got married in January 2013. On 10 July 2016, Okanlawon and his wife Damilola welcomed their first child.

Filmography

Awards

References

Year of birth missing (living people)
Living people
Male actors from Lagos
University of Lagos alumni
Nigerian male stage actors
Nigerian male film actors
21st-century Nigerian male actors
Yoruba male actors
Nigerian male voice actors
Nigerian male television actors
New York Film Academy alumni
Nigerian film award winners
Africa Magic Viewers' Choice Awards winners